The Huntress is the name of several fictional characters appearing in American comic books published by DC Comics, commonly in association with the superhero Batman. The two best-known women to bear the Huntress name are Helena Bertinelli and Helena Wayne, the latter being from an alternate universe. Although Helena Wayne and Helena Bertinelli are both superheroes, the Huntress of the Golden Age was a supervillain.

Characterization

Paula Brooks

The Golden Age Huntress was a supervillain with the real name of Paula Brooks who battled the superhero Wildcat, first appearing in Sensation Comics #68. She joined the second Injustice Society of America and stole Plymouth Rock. She married fellow supervillain the Sportsmaster.

The character was later retroactively renamed the Tigress in the pages of Young All-Stars. These stories took place prior to her villainous career. At this point, the young Paula Brooks was a superheroine, and fought both Nazis and criminals as a Young All-Stars member.

Helena Wayne

The Bronze Age Huntress was Helena Wayne, the daughter of the Batman and Catwoman of Earth-Two, an alternate universe established in the early 1960s as the world where the Golden Age stories took place. Earth-Two was also the home of the Golden Age versions of various DC characters.

Created by Paul Levitz, Joe Staton, and Bob Layton, her first appearance was in All Star Comics #69 (December 1977) and DC Super Stars #17, which came out the same day and revealed her origin. She appeared in Batman Family #17-20 when it expanded into the Dollar Comics format for its last few issues. The bulk of her solo stories appeared as backup features in issues of Wonder Woman beginning with issue #271 (September 1980).

Helena's parents trained her to be a superb athlete. After finishing school, she joined the law firm of Cranston and Grayson, where Dick Grayson, alias Robin, was a partner.

Helena began her superhero career when a criminal blackmailed her mother into resuming action once again as Catwoman—an act that eventually led to her death. Helena, deciding to bring the criminal responsible to justice, created a costume for herself, fashioned some weapons from her parents' equipment (including her eventual trademark, a crossbow), and set out to bring in the criminal. After accomplishing this, Helena decided to continue to fight crime under the codename "The Huntress".

In All Star Comics #72, Helena formally joined the Justice Society of America where she struck up a friendship with fellow new superheroine Power Girl. As a JSA member, she participated in several of the annual JLA/JSA meetings, most of which took place on Earth-One. Helena was also briefly associated with the superhero group Infinity, Inc.

During the 1985 miniseries Crisis on Infinite Earths, Helena was killed while attempting to save the lives of several children. After Crisis ended, Helena Wayne's existence, like that of her parents and Earth-Two's Dick Grayson, was retroactively erased from the remaining Earth and the world no longer remembered her.

The New 52

In the final issue of 52, a new Multiverse is revealed, originally consisting of 52 identical realities. Among the parallel realities shown is one designated "Earth-2". As a result of Mister Mind "eating" aspects of this reality, it takes on visual aspects similar to the Pre-Crisis Earth-Two, including the Huntress among other Justice Society of America characters. The names of the characters and the team are not mentioned in the panel in which they appear, but the Huntress is visually similar to the Helena Wayne Huntress. Geoff Johns confirmed that it is indeed the Earth-2 Batman's daughter, the Huntress. As prefigured by comments from Grant Morrison, this new alternate universe is not the original/Pre-Crisis Earth-Two and ensuing Justice Society of America exploration disclosed that this Helena Wayne/Huntress was a member of the Justice Society Infinity, Earth-2's merged JSA and Infinity, Inc. and was in a relationship with Dick Grayson/Robin in this world. Since Power Girl briefly visited that world, there has been no subsequent depiction of the new Helena Wayne/Huntress of Earth-2.

In September 2011, The New 52 rebooted DC's continuity. In this new timeline, the Huntress is re-established in 2012 in the ongoing series Worlds' Finest, along with Power Girl. In this series, the Huntress is in reality Helena Wayne from Earth 2. She and Power Girl, who is Superman's cousin on Earth 2, were mysteriously hurled to the mainstream DC Universe after a battle with Darkseid's minions. A retrospective prequel to the series disclosed that her mother was the former Catwoman (Selina Kyle).

Helena Bertinelli

Following the 1985 miniseries Crisis on Infinite Earths, the Helena Wayne version of the Huntress was removed from continuity. DC Comics introduced a new version of the Huntress with the same first name and physical appearance, and with a similar costume, but with an entirely different backstory and personality.

The Pre-New 52 Huntress was Helena Rosa Bertinelli (also Hellena Janice Bertinelli in the miniseries Robin III: Cry of the Huntress), the daughter of one of Gotham's Mafia bosses who, after seeing her entire family murdered in a mob hit, vows revenge. During the "No Man's Land" story line, she works as Batgirl, but not alongside Batman (whom the citizens believe abandoned them).

Batman considers her to be too unpredictable and violent. Others in the Batman family feel differently; Nightwing had a brief romantic fling with her, while she and Tim Drake share a good professional relationship. Early in his career he worked with the female vigilante, and later cleared her name in a murder case. Batman sponsors Huntress's membership in the Justice League, and for some time, Huntress was a respected member of the League. Under the guidance of heroes such as Superman, she grew in confidence, but was forced to resign after Batman stopped her from killing the villain Prometheus.

The emergence of Bertinelli as the Huntress has not kept DC from occasionally paying homage to the Helena Wayne incarnation of the character. During a Post-Crisis JLA-JSA team-up, Bertinelli was so impressed with the skill and prowess of the Flash (Jay Garrick), Hippolyta, and Wildcat, stating humbly, "I wanna join the Justice Society . . . " Additionally, Power Girl sought her out for someone to talk to, even though the two have never really interacted.

The character was featured in the comic book series Birds of Prey from 2003 onwards as a member of the eponymous team. Although she is still depicted as prone to excessive violence, she became a valuable member of the team.

In the alternate timeline of the 2011 "Flashpoint" storyline, the Huntress joined with the Amazons' Furies.

Media tie-in comics
The Huntress makes an appearance in issue #19 of Batman and Robin Adventures and in issue #2 of the comic book tie-in of Justice League Unlimited, set in the DC Animated Universe.

In the prequel comics for the video game Injustice: Gods Among Us, the Huntress is a member of Batman's insurgency that combats Superman's One-Earth regime and she is very close to Kate Kane and Renee Montoya until she is accidentally killed by Wonder Woman.

In the Arrow tie-in comic, after the death of her boyfriend Michael, Helena goes to Sicily in Italy where she discovers the existence of La Morte Sussurrata (The Whispered Death), an organization of killers trained by the Hashshashins of Persia when they migrated to Italy. Helena begins to have sex with various members to earn their trust, one of them being Silvio, who trains her to become an effective killer. She uses those skills to take down her father's criminal empire and her father.

In the Arrow: Season 2.5 comic, Helena is released from prison by Lyla Michaels and Roy Harper after Felicity Smoak was taken by the Renegades and Oliver had no backup. She helps him to take down their enemies, including Lyle Bolton, and bring back Felicity.

Reception
Michael Eury and Gina Misiroglu characterized the original Huntress Paula Brooks as "a relatively obscure Golden Age villainess". When that title was borrowed next for Helena Wayne, the reviewers found her "intriguingly distinguished by her parentage". This incarnation of the Huntress "so enthralled DC readers fascinated by the heroine's lineage and motivation" that she was spun out into her own successful series. When the character was eliminated by DC's Crisis on Infinite Earths series, it "was too popular to fully jettison from the DC universe". Consequently, the Huntress incarnation of Helena Bertinelli was introduced in her own series, and also used in a number of other media.

Gladys L. Knight remarks that the Huntress Helena Wayne starts her career fighting criminals to avenge her mother death, but unlike Catwoman she "fights on the right side of the law and is indeed distraught over her mother's criminal past". Knight found the Huntress' storylines thrilling.

See also
 List of Batman supporting characters
 List of Batman family enemies

References

External links
Amalgam Comics: The Huntress
Lair of the Huntress
Sequential Tart: The Huntress and the Hunted
The Watchtower Creator opinions on the Huntress

Batman characters code names
Characters created by Paul Levitz
DC Comics female superheroes
DC Comics female supervillains
Fictional archers
Set index articles on comics
Vigilante characters in comics
Articles about multiple fictional characters